Edmée Elizabeth Monica Dashwood, née de la Pasture (9 June 1890 – 2 December 1943), commonly known as E. M. Delafield, was a prolific English author. She is best known for her largely autobiographical Diary of a Provincial Lady, which took the form of a journal of the life of an upper-middle class Englishwoman living mostly in a Devon village of the 1930s. In sequels, the Provincial Lady buys a flat in London, travels to America and attempts to find war-work during the Phoney War. Delafield's other works include an account of a visit to the Soviet Union, but this is not part of the Provincial Lady series, despite being reprinted with the title The Provincial Lady in Russia.

Life 
Delafield was born in Steyning, Sussex. She was the elder daughter of Count Henry Philip Ducarel de la Pasture, of Llandogo Priory, Monmouthshire, and Elizabeth Lydia Rosabelle, daughter of Edward William Bonham, who as Mrs Henry de la Pasture was also a well-known novelist. The pen name Delafield was a thin disguise suggested by her sister Yoe. After Count Henry died, her mother married Sir Hugh Clifford GCMG, who governed the colonies of the Gold Coast (1912–19), Nigeria (1919–25), Ceylon (1925–27) and the Malay States.

In 1911, Delafield was accepted as a postulant by a French religious order established in Belgium. Her account of the experience, The Brides of Heaven, was written in 1931 and eventually published in her biography. "The motives which led me, as soon as I was 21, to enter a French Religious Order are worthy of little discussion, and less respect" she begins. This account includes being told by the Superior that if a doctor advised a surgical operation "your Superiors will decide whether your life is of sufficient value to the community to justify the expense. If it is not, you will either get better without the operation or die. In either case you will be doing the will of God and nothing else matters." She finally left when she learned that Yoé was planning to join another enclosed order: "the thought of the utter and complete earthly separation that must necessarily take place between us was more than I could bear".

At the outbreak of World War I, she worked as a nurse in a Voluntary Aid Detachment in Exeter, under the formidable command of Georgiana Buller (daughter of a general who held the Victoria Cross, and later a Dame Commander of the Order of the British Empire). Delafield's first novel Zella Sees Herself was published in 1917. At the end of the war she worked for the South-West Region of the Ministry of National Service in Bristol, and published two more novels. She continued to publish one or two novels every year until nearly the end of her life in 1943.

On 17 July 1919, she married Colonel Arthur Paul Dashwood, OBE, a younger son of Sir George Dashwood, 6th Baronet and Lady Mary Seymour (youngest daughter of Francis Seymour, 5th Marquess of Hertford). Dashwood was an engineer who had built the massive docks at Hong Kong Harbour. After two years in the Malay States, Delafield insisted on coming back to England and they lived in Croyle, an old house in Kentisbeare, Devon, on the Bradfield estate where he became the land agent. She had two children, Lionel and Rosamund. At the initial meeting of the Kentisbeare Women's Institute, Delafield was unanimously elected president, and remained so until she died.

She was a great admirer and champion of Charlotte M. Yonge, and an authority on the Brontës. In 1938 Lorna Mesney became her secretary, and kept a diary to which Delafield's biographer was given access.

Delafield's son Lionel died in late 1940, some suggest by his own hand, something from which she never recovered. Three years later, after collapsing while giving a lecture in Oxford, Delafield died on 2 December 1943 after a progressive decline which first necessitated a colostomy and visits to a neurologist. She was buried under her favourite yew tree in Kentisbeare churchyard, near her son. Her mother survived her and died in October 1945. Her daughter, Rosamund Dashwood, emigrated to Canada.

Diary of a Provincial Lady 
Delafield became great friends with Margaret Mackworth, 2nd Viscountess Rhondda, and became a director of Time and Tide. When the editor 'wanted some light "middles", preferably in serial form, she promised to think of something to submit'. It was thus, in 1930, that her most popular and enduring work Diary of a Provincial Lady was written. This largely autobiographical novel substituted the names of "Robin" and "Vicky" for her own children, Lionel and Rosamund. However, when Arthur Watts drew the character Vicky for the published book, he did not use Delafield's children as his model. Instead he drew a six-year-old girl called Faith Nottidge from a fashionable family of Chelsea. The book has never been out of print.

The novel inspired several sequels which chronicled later portions of her life: The Provincial Lady Goes Further, The Provincial Lady in America, and The Provincial Lady in Wartime. She later worked for the Ministry of Information. The Dictionary of National Biography says "On the outbreak of the Second World War, she lectured for the Ministry of Information and spent some weeks in France." - however we can surmise from The Provincial Lady in Wartime that in fact she spent quite a bit of time vainly looking for 'proper' war work and working in an ARP canteen.

In 1961, Delafield's daughter, Rosamund Dashwood, published Provincial Daughter, a semi-autobiographical account of her own experiences with domestic life in the 1950s.

Reception 
Delafield was a respected and highly prolific author in her day, but only the Provincial Lady series achieved wide commercial success.  Her first novel Zella Sees Herself quickly went into a second impression and a first royalty cheque of £50.

Rachel Ferguson complained that she wrote too much and her work was uneven whilst considering The Way Things Are a "completely perfect novel" and suggesting (in 1939) that "her humour and super-sensitive observation should make of her one of the best and most significant writers we possess, a comforting and timeless writer whose comments will delight a hundred years hence."

Books 
Zella Sees Herself (1915) - her first work, written in Exeter. "curiously savage, self obsessed, alarming" or "quite delightful, full of brilliant touches, serious, sad and funny at the same time".
A Perfectly True Story - a short story contributed to The Girl Guides' Book. It is an account of Delafield's marriage into the circle of squires & baronets. Kirtington Park was built by Sir James Dashwood, and was the ancestral home of her husband.
The War Workers (1918) - the travails of working in a Supply Depot under the tyrannical control of Charmain Vivian, who meets her match in a newly arrived clergyman's daughter Grace Jones.
The Pelicans (1918) - centres round an agonising account of conversion to the Roman Catholic Church and a death in a convent.
Consequences (1919) - Republished in 2000 by Persephone Books.
Tension (1920)
The Heel of Achilles (1920) - the story of a lower middle-class girl marrying into the gentry, whose daughter Jane rebels against her.
Humbug (1921) - a novel attacking 'amateur educationalists' in which Lily Stanhope marries a shouting bore, but eventually achieves a resolution to strive to eliminate the humbug which has dogged her own upbringing from that of her child.
The Optimist (1922) - largely dominated by Canon Morchard, an 'utterly impossible clergyman' who starts as a horrible man but becomes quite saintly.
A Reversion to Type (1923) - a bad hat from a country family marries Rose, a girl he meets on a voyage to Ceylon. After he dies of drink, she makes her life in his family house, finally managing to escape her guilt over her degenerate son.
The Sincerest Form... (1924?) - a series of parodies of leading novelists including H. G. Wells, Arnold Bennett, Eleanor Smith, GB Stern, Evelyn Waugh & Rosamund Lehmann.
Messalina of the Suburbs (1924) - dedicated to Delafield's best friend 'Rose', (Dr Margaret Posthuma, aunt of Gandhi's disciple Mirabehn), it is based on a famous murder case, in which Edith Thompson was convicted and hanged in 1923 as an accomplice of her lover Bywaters who attacked and killed her husband. Although she was certainly shocked and astonished by the attack, her letters to Bywaters describe her repeated attempts to poison her husband. (Re-published 1970 Freeport, N.Y., Books for Libraries Press)
Mrs Harter (1924) - seen through the eyes of Sir Miles Fowler, a crippled baronet. At one level, the story of 'fast' Mrs Harter's developing romance with Captain Patch, which reaches a crisis with the arrival of her husband. However, it is really a study in how differently the same events are perceived by people who are interested in ideas/things/people.
The Chip and the Block (1925) - Charles Ellery has an egocentric disregard of the need and sufferings of others, but the development whereby he ceased to plague his family and marries a second wife who can control him is highly enjoyable for the reader.
Jill (1926) - the story of Major Jack Galbriath who, with his wife Doreen has to live on their wits, which are not particularly brilliant.
The Entertainment (1927) - a collection of short stories, including The Tortoise, where Charles Ellery re-appears.
The Way Things Are (1927) - Laura - a character notably similar to Delafield - literary, is stuck in country with her dull husband Alfred (of whom she is "very fond"), has a semi-affair with an admirer, Duke Ayland. Meanwhile, Lady Kingsely-Browne's daughter Beebee throws herself at a famous author (DHL?) thus losing "the richest commoner in England" who marries Laura's sister. Laura renounces the Duke (in a way that inspired Still Life and Brief Encounter). Described by Rachel Ferguson as Delafield's most perfect novel. Reprinted by Virago in 1988 with a new introduction by Nicola Beauman.
The Suburban Young Man (1928) - Peter has fallen in love with the well-born Antoinette, but his Scottish wife Hope remains in admirable control of the situation. Dedicated "To All Those Nice People who have so often asked me to Write a Story about Nice People".
What Is Love? (1928) (published in America as First Love) - Ellie has been abandoned at an early age by her predatory mother, and is courted by Simon but then dumped in favour of Vicky, Eton-cropped and wearer of an eye-glass.
Women Are Like That (1929) - a collection of short stories dedicated to her sister Yoe.
Turn Back the Leaves (1930) - dedicated to her agent A. D. Peters, it begins with a doomed love affair in 1890 and ends in 1930 with the old Catholic family it has devastated. It was highly praised by all reviewers.
Diary of a Provincial Lady (1930) - this became a best-seller and has never been out of print. It was chosen as the Book Society Book of the Month for December, 1930.
Challenge to Clarissa (1931) - Clarissa Fitzmaurice, a rich harridan, bullies the life out of her husband, his daughter Sophie, and her son by her first marriage, Lucien. But eventually Lucien and Sophie defy Clarissa and marry. She also includes a lady novelist Olivia who has shared her home for many years with her friend Elinor, and whose friendship had weathered, "as Miss Fish resentfully observed, the fuss about The Well of Loneliness." (See Boston marriage.)
The Provincial Lady Goes Further (1932) - continuation, beginning with astonishment at receiving a large royalty cheque (from Provincial Lady). Dedicated to Cass Canfield.
Thank Heaven Fasting (1932) - Monica Ingram sees no future other than marriage, but a foolish romantic encounter has muddied her reputation and wilted her confidence, and she seems condemned to live forever with her domineering mother. "The best of her 'debutante' works, a minor classic that will endure" The title is a quotation from Shakespeare (As You Like It, Act 3, Scene 5). The quotation in full is "Down on your knees and thank heaven, fasting, for a good man's love." (Re-published 1969 Howard Baker, also re-published by Virago).
Gay Life (1933) - set in the Côte d'Azur, Hilary and Angie Moon have to live on their wits and her beauty.
General Impressions (1933) - a collection of series of humorous articles in Time and Tide.
The Provincial Lady in America (1934)
The Bazalgettes (1936) - a spoof anonymous novel of 1870–6. Delafield asked to be allowed to review it for The Listener but was unable to do so.
Faster! Faster! (1936) - Claudia Winstoe, a dynamo of energy, runs London Universal Services and her home with equal tyranny. Pushing herself too hard, she dies in a collision, and the family and business get on fine without her.
As Others Hear Us: A Miscellany (1937) - a collection of humorous sketches which appeared in Punch and Time & Tide.
Nothing Is Safe (1937) - a fictional indictment of parents who forget what their whims may do to the happiness and security of their young children.
Ladies and Gentlemen in Victorian Fiction (1937) - published by Leonard & Virginia Woolf. Delafield was a great fan of Charlotte Mary Yonge.
Straw Without Bricks: I Visit Soviet Russia - (1937 - published in the U.S. as I visit the Soviets and re-published 1985 by Academy Chicago Publishers). This is her account of six months in Russia, mostly on a collective farm and in Leningrad.
Three Marriages (1939) - variations on a theme in three short stories.
The Provincial Lady in Wartime (1940) - resumed at the insistence of Harold Macmillan. The Lady gets a flat in Buckingham Street (above the offices of her agent AD Peters) and works in the Air Raid Precautions HQ under the Adelphi building. Eventually she gets a job and the diary concludes.
No One Now Will Know (1941) - a decidedly bleak book in which Fred and Lucian (Lucy) both love Rosalie. The title is a quotation from the Irish poem 'The Glens of Antrim': "No one now will know, which of them loved her the most".
Late and Soon (1943) - dedicated to Kate O'Brien. Valentine Arbell is the widowed chatelaine of a large country house in WW2. Her loose daughter Primrose is having an affair with Valentine's former admirer Rory, but Rory rekindles his passion for Valentine and they marry.
Love Has No Resurrection (1939)
The Brontes, their lives recorded by their contemporaries (1935 - Published by Leonard & Virginia Woolf. Re-published 1979 Meckler Books)

Drama
Film script with Vera Allinson: Crime on the Hill (1933), which starred Sally Blane, Anthony Bushell, Lewis Casson and Nigel Playfair.
Film script with Edward Knoblock: Moonlight Sonata (1938), which starred Paderewski, Charles Farrell, Marie Tempest & Eric Portman.
To See Ourselves (1930) - Caroline, married to a rather dull Freddie, yearns for love and romance, but is sadly thwarted by domesticity. This play was a great success, broadcast repeatedly and was included in Gollancz's Famous Plays of 1931
The Glass Wall (1932) - A play about religious vocation, clearly somewhat autobiographical, and with many parts for women.
The Little Boy - a radio play in which Hermione Gingold's character was murdered.

See also 
The Queen's Book of the Red Cross

References

Further reading
Maurice L. McCullen (1985, 143 pages), E. M. Delafield, Twayne 
The life of a provincial lady/Violet Powell. (Heinemann, 1988) 190 pages. 
The heirs of Jane Austen/Rachel R. Mather. (Peter Lang, 1996)  (Treats E M Delafield, EF Benson and Angela Thirkell)
"The Diarist; How E. M. Delafield launched a genre," The New Yorker, May 9, 2005, page 44, 3903 words, by Cynthia Zarin
Dictionary of National Biography

External links 
E. M. Delafield Biography and Novels

Works by E. M. Delafield at Project Gutenberg Australia
 

1890 births
1943 deaths
People from Steyning
20th-century pseudonymous writers
Pseudonymous women writers
English diarists
Women diarists
20th-century diarists
British women memoirists